Ronald Stallworth could refer to: 

Ron Stallworth (born 1953), American police officer
Ron Stallworth (American football) (born 1966), American football player